Dyspessa algeriensis is a species of moth of the family Cossidae. It is found in Algeria and Tunisia.

References

Dyspessa
Moths described in 1858
Moths of Africa